The Boswell School, now the Boswell Baptist Church, is a historic school building in rural western Izard County, Arkansas.  It is located in the hamlet of Boswell, at the end of County Road 196.  It is a single-story fieldstone structure, with a side gable roof and a projecting front-gable entry porch.  The school was built in 1934 with funding from the Works Progress Administration, and was used as a local public school until 1950, when the local school district was consolidated with that of Calico Rock.  The building was then converted to a church.

The building was listed on the National Register of Historic Places in 1992.

See also
National Register of Historic Places listings in Izard County, Arkansas

References

School buildings on the National Register of Historic Places in Arkansas
School buildings completed in 1934
Schools in Izard County, Arkansas
Baptist schools in the United States
National Register of Historic Places in Izard County, Arkansas
1934 establishments in Arkansas
Works Progress Administration in Arkansas
Baptist Christianity in Arkansas